Okara (Punjabi), is the capital city of Okara District in the Punjab province of Pakistan. The name Okara is derived from Okaan, which is the name of a type of tree. It is the 23rd largest city of Pakistan by population. The city is located southwest of the city of Lahore and Faisalabad is 100 km bypassing away Ravi River. It is known for its agriculture-based economy and cotton mills. The nearest major city to Okara is Sahiwal, which was formerly known as Montgomery. Kasur is also located in the east of the city. Pakistan military dairy farms, known for their cheese, are situated in Okara. Pul Dhool near Abdulla Sugar Mill is a town in the Okara district. Pul Dhool is on Hujra Chunian road. From Hujra Shah Muqeem 9KM and from Chunian 17KM.These farms were established before the creation of Pakistan in 1947.

Climate
The climate of Okara is usually warm and dry. The hottest months are May to July, when temperatures may reach .

History
Okara is a relatively new agricultural city; during the period of British rule there was a forest of Okaan where the city has been rebuilt, and from this, the name of the city was derived. During British rule, the area was part of Montgomery District and contained a large saltpeter refinery. There are many textile mills in Okara. The predominantly Muslim population supported the Muslim League and the Pakistan Movement. After the independence of Pakistan in 1947, the Muslim refugees settled in the Okara District. In 1982, the city became the headquarters of the newly created Okara District. Okara has had a railway line since 1892.

Okara is known for its cattle breed known as Sahiwal and a water buffalo breed known as Niliravi. It is very rich in livestock population and production. Livestock Production Research Institute Bahadar Nagar Farm is a very large government farm near Okara. The farm has many cows, buffalo, bulls (for reproduction), goats, and sheep.

Olympian Liaqat Ali Wahlah
Ali was awarded a wildcard for the 2012 Summer Olympics in London, the UK where he represented Pakistan by competing in the 100m. He eventually came fourth in the men's 100-meter preliminary race with a time of 10.90 seconds. He missed the third position by just 0.01 seconds and thus did not qualify for the next round.[3] He won two Bronze medals for Pakistan at the 2010 South Asian games. Ali has participated in 17 international competitions and has secured a medal in each. He has also represented Pakistan at the 2009 and 2013 World Athletics championships.[4] Ali has completed the IAAF Level 1 coach course, He is now a certified IAAF coach.

Administration
The city of Okara serves as district and tehsil capital and is itself administratively subdivided into ten Union councils.

Politics 
Political leaders
 NA-142 Chaudhry Riaz-ul-Haq
 PP-188 Mian Yawar Zaman
 PP-189 Muneeb-ul-Haq
 NA-143 Ch Nadeem Abbas Rabera

See also
Okarvi

References 

 
Cities and towns in Okara District

Villages 

Chak (1,2,3,4,5 & 6)/4.L
Chak (47,48,49,50,51,52,53,54,55 & 56)/2L
Satghara
Shahbhor
Jaboka
Jandraka
Bangla Gogera
36 Joray
Tabrooq